Shahrud Rural District is in Shahrud District of Khalkhal County, Ardabil province, Iran. At the census of 2006, its population was 1,864 in 574 households; there were 1,423 inhabitants in 509 households at the following census of 2011; and in the most recent census of 2016, the population of the rural district was 1,213 in 479 households. The largest of its four villages was Derav, with 439 people.

References 

Khalkhal County

Rural Districts of Ardabil Province

Populated places in Ardabil Province

Populated places in Khalkhal County